CIH Bank S.A. is a Moroccan bank. It is part of the Caisse de dépôt et de gestion (CDG) group, concentrating especially in the real estate and tourism sectors. It also provides retail banking services.

History 
As of 2014, CIH Bank offers a broader service across all sectors of the banking market.

Services  
in 2022, CIH and MasterCard launched a joint digital payment service "CIH PAY", that allows customers to use their phones for payments and transactions

Previous presidents 
 Ayoub Boubalgha (2001)
 Akram El Masfioui (2002)
 Abdelouahed Souhail  (1998 – 2001)
 Mohamed El Alej
 Khalid Alioua (24 July 2004 – 24 April 2009)
 Ali Harraj (Interim)
 Ahmed Rahhou (6 October 2009 – 4 June 2019)

External links 
  Official website
  CIH Bank Stock in the Casablanca Stock Exchange

References 

Banks established in 1920
1920 establishments in Morocco